Stanley Victor Levey (December 22, 1914 – March 5, 1971) was an American journalist. He covered labor and business news for the New York Times, CBS News and Scripps-Howard Newspapers. His work landed him on the master list of Nixon political opponents.

Levey was born into a Jewish family in Oneonta, New York, to Abe and Mildred (Benes) Levey, who were both born to Polish immigrant parents. His father was a clothing salesman. He earned his undergraduate and master's degrees at the University of Rochester. He died at George Washington University Hospital in Washington, D.C., several months after suffering a heart attack.

References

1914 births
1971 deaths
20th-century American Jews
American people of Polish-Jewish descent
People from Oneonta, New York
University of Rochester alumni
American male journalists
20th-century American non-fiction writers
20th-century American male writers
The New York Times writers